This is a list of notable events in music that took place in the year 1978.

Specific locations
1978 in British music
1978 in Norwegian music

Specific genres
1978 in country music
1978 in heavy metal music
1978 in jazz

Events

January–April
January 14 – The Sex Pistols play their final show (until a 1996 reunion) at San Francisco's Winterland Ballroom.
January 16 – Elton John appears on this week's People (magazine) without his trademark glasses. John will still wear glasses occasionally for the next ten years until wearing them permanently again.
January 17 – Simple Minds make their very first live performance at Glasgow's Satellite City.
January 21 – As Saturday Night Fever becomes a cultural phenomenon, the soundtrack hits #1 on the Billboard Charts, where it will stay until July.
January 23 – Terry Kath, guitarist and founding member of rock band Chicago, dies from an accidental gunshot wound to the head from a gun he thought was unloaded, in Woodland Hills, Los Angeles; he is 32 years old.
January 25
Electric Light Orchestra kick off their "Out of the Blue" world tour in Honolulu, Hawaii.
Bob Dylan makes his directorial debut in the surrealist film Renaldo and Clara, shot during his Rolling Thunder Revue tour.
 January 26 – Workers at EMI's record processing plant in England refuse to press copies of The Buzzcocks's second single "What Do I Get?" because of its flipside, "Oh Shit!". The single is eventually pressed and goes on to become the band's first hit.
January 28 – By request, Ted Nugent autographs his name into a fan's arm with a bowie knife in Philadelphia.
February 4 – Elton John appears as the guest star on The Muppet Show.
February 10 – Van Halen debuts with a self-titled album; Eddie Van Halen introduces a powerful new sound and technique to world, while David Lee Roth is ushered in as the front man.
February 23 – The 20th Annual Grammy Awards are presented in Los Angeles, hosted by John Denver. Fleetwood Mac's Rumours wins Album of the Year, the Eagles' "Hotel California" wins Record of the Year and, in a rare tie, Barbra Streisand's "Evergreen (Love Theme from A Star Is Born)" and Debby Boone's "You Light Up My Life" both collectively win Song of the Year. Boone also wins Best New Artist.
March 11 – Kate Bush tops the UK Singles Chart with "Wuthering Heights", becoming the first-ever female artist to top the chart with a self-penned song.
March 18 – California Jam II is held at the Ontario Motor Speedway in California. Over 300,000 fans come to see Ted Nugent, Aerosmith, Santana, Dave Mason, Foreigner, Heart and more.
April 22
In the Eurovision Song Contest in Paris, France, victory goes to Israel's entry "A-Ba-Ni-Bi", performed by Izhar Cohen & The Alphabeta.
The "One Love Peace Concert" is held in Kingston, Jamaica, headlined by Bob Marley, making his first concert appearance since December 1976.
Steve Martin performs the original "King Tut" on Saturday Night Live; also this night, The Blues Brothers make their first appearance on the show.

May–July
May 6 – The Knack is formed (first album released in 1979).
May 13 – Barry Gibb becomes the only songwriter in history to have written 4 consecutive #1 singles on Billboard's Hot 100 Chart.
May 18 – The Buddy Holly Story, starring Gary Busey, is released. It would win the Academy Award for Best Music, Original Song Score and Its Adaptation or Best Adaptation Score, and earn a nomination for Best Actor in a Leading Role (Busey) and Best Sound.
May 25 – In a performance used for The Kids Are Alright, The Who play their last show with Keith Moon.
June 7 - Prince's debut single Soft and Wet is released by Warner Bros. Records.
June 10 – The Rolling Stones begin their 25-date US summer tour in Lakeland, Florida.
June 13 – The Cramps play a free concert for patients at the Napa State Mental Hospital.
June 16 – The film adaptation of the musical Grease, opens in theaters and is a box office hit.
June 20 – Grace Slick splits with Jefferson Starship the day after a disastrous concert in Hamburg, Germany, in which a heavily intoxicated Slick verbally abused the crowd and groped various fans and bandmates.
June 29 – Peter Frampton is nearly killed in a car accident in The Bahamas, suffering multiple broken bones, a concussion, and muscle damage.
July 1 – The first Texxas Jam is held over the July 4 long weekend at the Cotton Bowl in Dallas. The first day features Ted Nugent, Aerosmith, Frank Marino and Mahogany Rush, Heart, Journey, Head East, Atlanta Rhythm Section, Eddie Money, Van Halen and Walter Egan. Sunday consists of Willie Nelson headlining his sixth annual Fourth of July picnic.
July 15 – The Picnic at Blackbushe Aerodrome, Camberley, Surrey, England, a concert featuring Bob Dylan, Eric Clapton and Joan Armatrading, attracts some 200,000 people.
July 19 – Dead Kennedys play their first concert, at the Mabuhay Gardens in San Francisco, California.
July 21 – Sgt. Pepper's Lonely Hearts Club Band, a much-hyped musical film starring Peter Frampton and the Bee Gees performing the music of The Beatles, opens in theaters. The film is savaged by critics and proves a box office disappointment.
July 29 – Glenn Goins, one of the lead vocalists for the band Parliament-Funkadelic dies of Hodgkin's lymphoma at age of 24.
July 30 – Thin Lizzy officially announces that Gary Moore has replaced Brian Robertson on guitar.

August–December
August 26 – 80,000 concertgoers attend Mosport Speedway in Ontario for the "Canada Jam Festival", featuring sets by the Doobie Brothers, Commodores, Kansas, Village People, Dave Mason, the Atlanta Rhythm Section and Triumph.
August 26 – 67,000 Funk fans assembled at Soldier Field in Chicago, Illinois to attend the first annual Funk Festival, billed as "One Nation Under A Groove", featuring A Taste of Honey (band), Parlet, Con Funk Shun, the Bar-Kays, and Parliament-Funkadelic.
September 7 – The Who drummer Keith Moon dies in a central London flat after a prescription drug overdose at the age of 32.
September 14–16 – The Grateful Dead perform three shows in Giza, Egypt, very close to the Sphinx and Great Pyramid.
October 12 – Nancy Spungen, the American girlfriend of Sex Pistols bassist Sid Vicious, is found dead in a New York hotel room of a stab wound. Sid is arrested and charged with her murder.
October 21 – Founder members John Taylor and Nick Rhodes name their newly formed band Duran Duran after the character "Dr. Durand Durand" from the sci-fi film Barbarella the day after the film had been broadcast on BBC 1.
October 24 – Rolling Stones guitarist Keith Richards pleads guilty to a reduced charge of possessing heroin in Toronto in 1977. The more serious charge of drug trafficking is dropped and Richards is given a one-year suspended sentence as well as ordered to play a charity concert for the blind.
October 29 – Michael Schenker plays his final show with UFO in Stanford, California before leaving the group to rejoin Scorpions.
November 21 – French pop star Dalida performed a concert at New York's Carnegie Hall. 
November 25 
A now sober Alice Cooper releases the album From the Inside, which tells of his stay in rehab for alcoholism.
Aerosmith cuts a concert short after Steven Tyler suffers cuts to his face from a bottle that shatters upon hitting a stage monitor.
Donna Summer becomes the first female artist of the modern rock era to have the number one single (Mac Arthur Park) and album (Live and More) on Billboard charts simultaneously.
November 27 – Def Leppard's permanent drummer Rick Allen joins the band at the age of 15.
December 2 The seventh edition of the OTI Festival, the Latin American spin-off of the Eurovision Song Contest takes place in Santiago, Chile. The winning country is Brazil, represented by Denisse de Kalafe with her song "El amor...Cosa tan rara" (Love...Such a strange thing)
December 31 
Matthias Jabs joins Scorpions, replacing Uli Jon Roth.
The seventh annual New Year's Rockin' Eve special airs on ABC, with performances by Barry Manilow, Village People, Chuck Mangione, Tanya Tucker and Rick James.
CBS airs New Year's Eve with Guy Lombardo for the final time, nearly two years after the band leader's death and ending a 22-year run that began in 1956.
The Winterland Ballroom venue in San Francisco closes with a New Year's Eve performance by the Grateful Dead, New Riders of the Purple Sage and the Blues Brothers.
Iron Maiden records a demo, consisting of four songs, at Spaceward Studios in Cambridge which would eventually become The Soundhouse Tapes.

Also in 1978
Kenny Rogers continues his highly successful solo career with the single (and album) "The Gambler" and will go on to star in no less than five movies based around the song.
In the UK, singles sales are at their all-time high this year, boosted by the simultaneous peak of the disco and punk phenomena and the success of singles from the movie Grease.
Mozambique holds its first National Dance Festival, involving half a million people.
November – Iron Maiden hires lead singer Paul Di'Anno.
New Edition formed in 1978 in Massachusetts,  USA.

Bands disbanded
See :Category:Musical groups disestablished in 1978

Albums released

January

February

March

April

May

June

July

August

September

October

November

December

Release date unknown

2 Hot – Peaches & Herb 
3 Phasis – Cecil Taylor
After the Heat – Eno Moebius Roedelius
Africa Must Be Free by 1983 – Hugh Mundell
Against the Grain – Phoebe Snow 
Alive on Arrival – Steve Forbert
Ambient 1: Music for Airports – Brian Eno
Awaiting Your Reply – Resurrection Band
Animal House – Various Artists – Soundtrack
At the Third Stroke – Russ Ballard
At Yankee Stadium – NRBQ
Best Dressed Chicken in Town – Dr. Alimantado
The Best of Bette – Bette Midler 
Blam! – The Brothers Johnson 
Bloodbrothers – The Dictators
Bobby Caldwell – Bobby Caldwell
Book Early – City Boy
Bruised Orange – John Prine
Burchfield Nines – Michael Franks
Bush Doctor – Peter Tosh
Caravan to Midnight – Robin Trower
Carlene Carter – Carlene Carter
Cecil Taylor Unit – Cecil Taylor
Central Heating – Heatwave
Cha Cha – Herman Brood – Live
Cheryl Ladd – Cheryl Ladd
Chuck Berry Live in Concert – Chuck Berry – Live
Cidade do Salvador – Gilberto Gil
City Lights - Dr. John
Count Basie Meets Oscar Peterson – The Timekeepers – Count Basie and Oscar Peterson
The Cream – John Lee Hooker
Departure from the Northern Wasteland – Michael Hoenig
The Dirt Band - Nitty Gritty Dirt Band
DMZ – DMZ
Dream – Captain & Tennille
Dream Dancing  – Ella Fitzgerald
Dream of a Child – Burton Cummings
Durch die Wüste – Hans-Joachim Roedelius
Everybody's Dancin' – Kool & the Gang
Every Time Two Fools Collide – Kenny Rogers & Dottie West
Final Exam – Loudon Wainwright III 
Finzi: Cello Concerto, Clarinet Concerto – Yo-Yo Ma (Debut)
Fool Around – Rachel Sweet 
From Rats to Riches – Good Rats
Funk or Walk – The Brides of Funkenstein 
Funky Situation – Wilson Pickett 
Further Adventures Of – Bruce Cockburn
Génération 78 – Dalida
Get It Out'cha System – Millie Jackson
Get Off – Foxy
Girl Most Likely – Claudja Barry
Golden Country Origins – Bill Haley (pre-Comets recordings)
Grab It for a Second – Golden Earring
Greatest Hits – Captain & Tennille
Guaranteed – Ronnie Drew
Handsworth Revolution – Steel Pulse
Headin' Down into the Mystery Below - John Hartford 
Heat in the Street – Pat Travers
Honky Tonk Masquerade – Joe Ely
Hot Dawg - David Grisman
How Long Has This Been Going On? – Sarah Vaughan
I Love My Music – Wild Cherry
If You Knew Suzi... – Suzi Quatro 
The Incredible Shrinking Dickies – The Dickies
Instant Replay – Dan Hartman 
Janis Ian – Janis Ian

Killin' Time – Gasolin'
Lanquidity – Sun Ra
Life Beyond L.A. – Ambrosia
Life in a Scotch Sitting Room, Vol. 2 – Ivor Cutler
Lights from the Valley – Chilliwack 
Live at Last – Steeleye Span
Live Floating Anarchy 1977 – Gong
Live in London – Helen Reddy
Live in the Black Forest – Cecil Taylor
Live Tonite – Prism – live album
The London Concert – Oscar Peterson
Mama Let Him Play – Jerry Doucette
Marcus' Children – Burning Spear
Meanwhile Back in Paris – Streetheart 
Midstream – Debby Boone
Midnight Believer – B. B. King
Modra Rijeka – Indexi
Music for 18 Musicians – Steve Reich
Natural Force – Bonnie Tyler 
Night Rider – Count Basie and Oscar Peterson
No New York – Various Artists
No Smoke Without Fire – Wishbone Ash
Of Queues and Cures – National Health
The Paris Concert – Oscar Peterson
Pat Metheny Group – Pat Metheny Group
Pleasure Principle – Parlet
Portrait of the Artist as a Young Ram – Ram Jam
Power in the Darkness – Tom Robinson Band
Pronto Monto – Kate and Anna McGarrigle
Raydio – Raydio
Return of the Wanderer – Dion DiMucci
Return to Magenta – Mink DeVille
Salterbarty Tales – Earthstar
Sherbet – Sherbet
Shpritsz – Herman Brood
Sleeper Catcher – Little River Band
So Full of Love – The O'Jays
Solar Music – Live – Grobschnitt
Sounds...and Stuff Like That!! – Quincy Jones
Spyro Gyra – Spyro Gyra
Step II – Sylvester
Strangers in the Wind – Bay City Rollers
Super Blue – Freddie Hubbard
Survivor – Randy Bachman 
A Taste of Honey – A Taste of Honey 
Thank God It's Friday – Various Artists – Soundtrack
That's Life – Sham 69
There's a Light Beyond These Woods - Nanci Griffith
Third – Big Star
Together Again: For the First Time – Mel Tormé, Buddy Rich
Togetherness – L.T.D.
To the Limit – Joan Armatrading
Totally Hot – Olivia Newton-John
A Touch on the Rainy Side – Jesse Winchester
Truth n' Time – Al Green
Viva – La Düsseldorf
Von Gestern bis Heute – Die Flippers
Way of the Sun – Jade Warrior 
Weekend in L.A. – George Benson
Whatever Happened to Benny Santini? – Chris Rea
When I Dream – Crystal Gayle
Who's Happy Now? – Connie Francis 
The Wonderful Grand Band – The Wonderful Grand Band 
Worlds Away – Pablo Cruise
Yessir, That's My Baby – Count Basie and Oscar Peterson
You Light Up My Life – Johnny Mathis

Biggest hit singles
The following songs achieved the highest chart positions
in the charts of 1978.

Chronological table of US and UK number one hit singles
US number one singles and artist  (weeks at number one)

 "How Deep Is Your Love" – Bee Gees (2 weeks in 1977 + 1 week in 1978)
 "Baby Come Back" – Player (3)
 "Stayin' Alive" – Bee Gees (4)
 "(Love Is) Thicker Than Water" – Andy Gibb (2)
 "Night Fever" – Bee Gees (8), best selling single of the year
 "If I Can't Have You" – Yvonne Elliman (1)
 "With a Little Luck" – Paul McCartney & Wings (2)
 "Too Much, Too Little, Too Late" – Johnny Mathis & Deniece Williams (1)
 "You're The One That I Want" – John Travolta & Olivia Newton-John (1)
 "Shadow Dancing" – Andy Gibb (7)
 "Miss You" – The Rolling Stones (1)
 "Three Times a Lady" – Commodores (2)
 "Grease" – Frankie Valli (2)
 "Boogie Oogie Oogie" – A Taste of Honey (3)
 "Kiss You All Over" – Exile (4)
 "Hot Child in the City" – Nick Gilder (1)
 "You Needed Me" – Anne Murray (1)
 "MacArthur Park" – Donna Summer (3)
 "You Don't Bring Me Flowers" – Barbra Streisand & Neil Diamond (2)
 "Le Freak" – Chic (3 weeks in 1978 + 3 weeks in 1979)

UK number one singles and artist  (weeks at number one)

 "Mull of Kintyre" / "Girls' School" – Paul McCartney & Wings (5 weeks in 1977 + 4 weeks in 1978)
 "Uptown Top Ranking" – Althea & Donna (1)
 "Figaro" – Brotherhood of Man (1)
 "Take a Chance On Me" – ABBA (3)
 "Wuthering Heights" – Kate Bush (4)
 "Matchstalk Men and Matchstalk Cats and Dogs" – Brian and Michael (3)
 "Night Fever" – Bee Gees (2)
 "Rivers of Babylon" – Boney M (5) best selling single of the year
 "You're the One That I Want" – John Travolta & Olivia Newton-John (9)
 "Three Times a Lady" – Commodores (5)
 "Dreadlock Holiday" – 10cc (1)
 "Summer Nights" – John Travolta & Olivia Newton-John (7)
 "Rat Trap" – The Boomtown Rats (2)
 "Do Ya Think I'm Sexy?" – Rod Stewart (1)
 "Mary's Boy Child"/"Oh My Lord" – Boney M (4)

Top 40 Chart hit singles

Other Chart hit singles

Notable singles

Other Notable singles

Published popular music
 "Another Suitcase in Another Hall" w. Tim Rice m. Andrew Lloyd Webber from the musical Evita
 "Dallas theme song" m. Jerrold Immel
 "Don't Cry for Me Argentina" w. Tim Rice m. Andrew Lloyd Webber from the musical Evita
 "Grease" w.m. Barry Gibb from the film Grease
 "Honesty" w.m. Billy Joel
 "Hopelessly Devoted to You" w.m. John Farrar introduced by Olivia Newton-John in the film Grease
 "My Life" w.m. Billy Joel
 "Only the Good Die Young" w.m. Billy Joel
 "Sultans of Swing" w.m. Mark Knopfler
 "Thank You for Being a Friend" w.m. Andrew Gold
 "Three Times a Lady" w.m. Lionel Richie
 "You Don't Bring Me Flowers" w. Alan Bergman, Marilyn Bergman & Neil Diamond m. Neil Diamond
 "You're the One That I Want" w.m. John Farrar introduced by Olivia Newton-John and John Travolta in the film Grease

Classical music
John Adams (composer) – Shaker Loops, for string septet
Malcolm Arnold – Symphony No. 8
Peter Maxwell Davies – Salome, ballet in two acts
Jacob Druckman – Viola Concerto
Henri Dutilleux – Timbres, espace, mouvement
Arvo Pärt – Spiegel im Spiegel
Alexandre Rabinovitch-Barakovsky – Requiem pour une marée noire
Steve Reich – Music for a Large Ensemble
Iannis Xenakis – Mycènes Alpha

Opera
Robert Ashley – Perfect Lives
Lorenzo Ferrero – Rimbaud, ou le fils du soleil
Vivian Fine – The Women in the Garden
György Ligeti – Le Grand Macabre
Krzysztof Penderecki – Paradise Lost (libretto by Christopher Fry)
Aulis Sallinen –  The Red Line (Punainen viiva)

Ballet
Lorenzo Ferrero – Invito a nozze

Jazz

Musical theater
 Ain't Misbehavin' Broadway revue opened at the Longacre Theatre on May 9 and ran for 1604 performances
 The Best Little Whorehouse in Texas opened at the Entermedia Theatre on April 17 and ran for 85 performances. The show moved to Broadway in June 1978, and ran for 1584 performances.
 Eubie Broadway revue opened at the Ambassador Theatre on September 20 and ran for 439 performances
 Evita (Andrew Lloyd Webber and Tim Rice) – London production opened at the Prince Edward Theatre on June 21
 Hello, Dolly! (Jerry Herman) –  Broadway revival opened at the Lunt-Fontanne Theatre on March 5 and ran for 152 performances
 I'm Getting My Act Together and Taking It on the Road Off-Broadway production opened at the Anspacher Theater on June 14 and ran for 1165 performances
 Timbuktu Broadway production opened at the Mark Hellinger Theatre on March 1 and ran for 243 performances
 On The Twentieth Century Broadway production opened at the St. James Theatre on February 19 and ran for 460 performances

Musical films
 American Hot Wax
 The Buddy Holly Story
 Don
 FM
 Grease
 Heeralaal Pannalaal
 Rockers
 Sgt. Pepper's Lonely Hearts Club Band
 Thank God It's Friday
 The Wiz

Births
January 3 – Kimberley Locke, American singer
January 4 – Mai Meneses, Spanish singer-songwriter and guitarist
January 5 – Karnail Pitts, American rapper (d. 1999)
January 6 – Oksana Lyniv, Ukrainian conductor
January 9 – A. J. McLean, American singer (Backstreet Boys)
January 12
Kris Roe, American rock guitarist and singer (The Ataris)
Jeremy Camp, American Christian guitarist and singer
January 17 – Ricky Williams, English singer
January 20 – Sid Wilson, American rock turntablist (Slipknot, DJ Starscream)
January 21 
Nokio the N-Tity, American singer-songwriter and producer (Dru Hill)
Phil Stacey, American singer
January 23 – E. Kidd Bogart, American music executive, television producer, music publisher and songwriter
January 28 - Big Freedia, American rapper
January 31 – Ibolya Oláh, Hungarian singer
February 1 – Jeff Conrad (Phantom Planet)
February 12 – Brian Chase (Yeah Yeah Yeahs)
February 14 – Ryan Griffiths, guitarist (The Vines)
February 19 – Immortal Technique Underground rapper
February 22 – Jenny Frost, British singer (Atomic Kitten)
February 24 – John Nolan, American rock lead singer (Straylight Run)
February 28 – Jeanne Cherhal, French singer-songwriter
March 10 – Benjamin Burnley, American musician
March 12 – Claudio Sanchez, American singer/songwriter (Coheed & Cambria)
March 19 – Lenka,  Australian singer and actress
March 21 – Kevin Federline, American (Britney Spears, Shar Jackson) 
March 30 – Simon Webbe, English singer (Blue)
March 31 – Tony Yayo, American rapper
April 6 – Myleene Klass, English singer (Hear'Say), pianist, media personality and model
April 7 – Duncan James, English singer (Blue)
April 9 – Rachel Stevens,  English singer, songwriter, actress, television presenter, model and businesswoman (S Club 7)
April 11 – Thomas Thacker, Canadian singer
April 12 – Guy Berryman, Scottish rock bass player (Coldplay)
April 15 – Chris Stapleton, American country musician
April 16 – Jody Marie Gnant, American singer-songwriter and pianist
April 21
Jukka Nevalainen, Finnish drummer (Nightwish)
Branden Steineckert (The Used, Rancid)
April 22 – Jason Stollsteimer, American lead singer and guitarist (The Von Bondies)
May 3 – Paul Banks, American rock vocalist (Interpol)
 May 6 - Nick Littlemore, Australian musician, record producer, singer and songwriter
May 12 – Wilfred Le Bouthillier, Canadian singer
May 21 – Adam Gontier, Canadian-born rock musician (Three Days Grace)
May 22 – Katie Price,  English media personality, model, singer, author, and businesswoman. 
May 23 
 Scott Raynor, American rock musician (Blink-182)
 Phil Elverum, An American musician, songwriter, record producer and visual artist, best known for his musical projects The Microphones and Mount Eerie. (Married to deceased Geneviève Castrée, Formerly married to Michelle Williams (actress)) 
May 25 – Adam Gontier, Canadian singer, songwriter and musician (Former member of Three Days Grace and member of Saints Asonia)
May 29 – Adam Rickitt, British actor, singer and model
May 30 – Kianna Alarid, American indie rock singer and bass guitarist (Tilly and the Wall)
June 6 
Carl Barât, English rock singer and guitarist (The Libertines, Dirty Pretty Things)
Joy Enriquez, American singer and actress
June 7 – Tony Ahn, South Korean singer 
June 9 – Matthew Bellamy, English musician, singer and songwriter  (Muse)
June 10 – Shane West, American actor, punk rock musician and songwriter
June 13 – Jason Michael Carroll, American country musician
June 19 – Mía Maestro,  Argentine actress and singer-songwriter
June 24
Ariel Pink, American singer-songwriter, musician, producer (Atheif)
Emppu Vuorinen, Finnish guitarist and songwriter (Nightwish, Brother Firetribe, Altaria and Barilari)
June 25 – Chuckie, Surinamese DJ and producer  
June 27 – Lolly, English singer
June 29 
 Sam Farrar (Phantom Planet)
 Nicole Scherzinger, American recording artist, television personality and performer (The Pussycat Dolls) 
July 10 
 Jesse Lacey, singer/musician, member of Brand New and Taking Back Sunday
 Ray Kay, Norwegian director, music video director and photographer
July 16 – T. J. Jackson (singer), American singer and member 3T
July 17
Panda Bear, American singer-songwriter and keyboard player (Animal Collective and Jane)
Trevor McNevan, Canadian singer-songwriter (Thousand Foot Krutch and FM Static)
Émilie Simon, French singer-songwriter
July 18 – Annie Mac, Irish-born DJ and broadcast presenter
August 1 – Dhani Harrison, English musician and son of George Harrison of The Beatles
August 6 – Andreas Öberg, Swedish guitarist, songwriter and producer (Eurovision, Taeyeon, Red Velvet, EXO, NCT)
August 7 
 Jamey Jasta, American rock singer (Hatebreed)
 Justin Young (singer, born 1978), American Hawaiian singer-songwriter, musician and significant other of Colbie Caillat 
August 15 – Tim Foreman, American rock bassist (Switchfoot)
August 18 – Andy Samberg, American actor, comedian, filmmaker and musician, member of The Lonely Island and spouse of Joanna Newsome 
August 22 – James Corden, English actor, writer, producer, comedian, television host and singer
August 23 – Julian Casablancas, American indie rock singer-songwriter and record producer (The Strokes)
August 28
Max Collins (Eve 6)
Jess Margera, American drummer (CKY)
 August 30 – Maino, rapper
September 6 – Cisco Adler, American musician
 Foxy Brown (rapper) American rapper
September 9  – Johnny Shentall, English singer
September 11 – Ben Lee, Australian singer
September 20
Patrizio Buanne, Italian singer
Sarit Hadad, Israeli pop singer
 DJ White Shadow, American music producer and DJ (Lady Gaga) 
September 24 - Jack Dishel, Russian-American musician, actor, writer, director, comic and producer. (Married to Regina Spektor) 
September 28 – Nikki McKibbin, American singer (d. 2020) 
September 30 – Steve Klein (New Found Glory)
October 2 – Ayumi Hamasaki, Japanese singer
October 3 – Jake Shears, American singer
October 7 – Alison Balsom, English classical trumpeter
October 9 – Nicky Byrne, Irish singer (Westlife)
October 14 – Usher, American singer, dancer and actor
October 20 – Kira, German singer
October 22 - Ed Droste. American singer-songwriter and musician,
October 27  – Vanessa-Mae, British violinist
October 28 – Justin Guarini, American singer 
November 6 – Taryn Manning, American actress, singer-songwriter and fashion designer (Boomkat)
November 9 – Sisqó, American singer
November 10 – Eve, American rapper
November 11 – Aaron Bruno, American singer, songwriter, musician and multi-instrumentalist (Awolnation, Under the Influence of Giants, Home Town Hero)
November 13 – Nikolai Fraiture, American rock bassist (The Strokes)
November 16 – Carolina Parra (Cansei de Ser Sexy)
November 18 – Andris Nelsons, Latvian conductor
November 22 – Karen O, South Korean-born American singer, songwriter, musician and record producer (Yeah Yeah Yeahs)
November 23 – Alison Mosshart,  American singer, songwriter and artist, lead vocalist of The Kills and The Dead Weather 
November 25 – Shiina Ringo, Japanese singer and musician
November 30 
Clay Aiken, American singer
 Gael García Bernal, Mexican film actor, director, singer, musician, model and producer
December 1 – Brad Delson, American alternative rock guitarist (Linkin Park)
December 2
Nelly Furtado, Canadian/Portuguese singer, songwriter, record producer, instrumentalist
Chris Wolstenholme, English alternative rock bass guitarist ((Muse))
December 9, – Jesse Metcalfe, American singer and actor
December 13 – laza Morgan, Jamaican-American singer and rapper
December 15
 Ned Brower, American rock drummer (Rooney)
 Mark Jansen,  Dutch guitarist, vocalist and songwriter (After Forever, Epica, MaYaN)
December 21
Maya Jupiter,  Mexican/Turkish Australian rapper, songwriter, MC and radio personality
Shaun Morgan, South African singer, songwriter, musician, guitarist (Seether)
December 23 – Esthero, Canadian singer-songwriter
December 24 – Tonedeff, American rapper
December 28 
 John Legend, American singer-songwriter, actor, musician and actor
 Phonte, American rapper
December 29
Steve Kemp, British musician (Hard-Fi)
LaToya London, American R&B and soul singer

Deaths
January 3 – Jack Oakie, 74, actor in many musical films of the 1940s
January 23
Terry Kath, 31, Chicago guitarist and vocalist (unintentional self-inflicted gunshot )
Vic Ames, 52, pop singer (Ames Brothers)
January 31 – Gregory Herbert, Blood, Sweat & Tears saxophonist
February 7 – Dimitrie Cuclin, 82, composer and musicologist
February 24 – Mrs Mills, 59, honky-tonk pianist
March 4 – Joe Marsala, 71, clarinetist and songwriter
March 11 – Claude François, 39, singer-songwriter (electrocuted)
March 17 – Malvina Reynolds, 77, US folk/blues singer-songwriter
March 18 – Peggy Wood, 86, actress and singer
March 21 – Louis Cottrell, Jr., 67, saxophonist and clarinet player (b. 1911)
April 3 – Ray Noble, 74, composer and bandleader
April 21 – Sandy Denny, 31, folk singer (Fairport Convention) (cerebral haemorrhage)
May 1 – Aram Khachaturian, 74, composer
May 5 – Ján Móry, 85, Slovak composer
May 26 – Tamara Karsavina, 93, ballerina
July 14 – Maria Grinberg, 69, pianist
July 29 – Glenn Goins, 24, Parliament Funkadelic guitarist and singer (Hodgkin's lymphoma)
August 1 – Rudolf Kolisch, 82, Viennese and American violinist and quartet leader
August 14 – Joe Venuti, 74, US jazz violinist
August 24 – Louis Prima, 67, jazz musician
September 6 – Tom Wilson, 47, producer
September 7 – Keith Moon, 32, drummer of The Who (drug overdose)
September 24 – Ruth Etting, 80, US "torch" singer
October 6 – Johnny O'Keefe, 43, Australian Singer
October 9 – Jacques Brel, 49, singer-songwriter
October 12 – Nancy Spungen, 20, girlfriend of Sid Vicious
October 23 – Maybelle Carter née Addington, 69, US country singer and musician, member of the Carter Family
November 12 – Howard Swanson, 71, composer
November 18 – Lennie Tristano, 59, jazz pianist
December 3 – William Grant Still, 83, composer
December 27 – Chris Bell, 27, singer-songwriter (auto accident)

Awards
19th Annual Grammy Awards
1978 Country Music Association Awards
Eurovision Song Contest 1978
20th Japan Record Awards

References

External links

Pop Culture Madness 1978 Pop Music Chart

 
20th century in music
Music by year